Weng may refer to:
 Weng (surname), a Chinese surname
 Weng, Germany, a town in the district of Landshut, Bavaria, Germany
 Weng im Innkreis, a town in the district of Braunau am Inn, Upper Austria, Austria
 Weng im Gesäuse, a town in the district of Liezen, Styria, Austria
 WENG, a radio station in Englewood, Florida, United States